The 1936 Slippery Rock Rockets football team represented Slippery Rock State Normal School—now known as Slippery Rock University of Pennsylvania—in the 1936 college football season.  In N. Kerr Thompson's 16th year as head coach, the Rockets compiled a 6–3 record and outscored their opponents 93 to 70.  They went 3–1 against conference opponents, finishing fourth in the Pennsylvania State Teachers conference.

The team is most famous for a news story that circulated around the United States and used the transitive property to declare Slippery Rock the national champion. The humorous story was widely popular, and gave Slippery Rock college a good deal of notoriety.

Schedule

References

Slippery Rock
Slippery Rock football seasons
Slippery Rock Football